Wolsey is a town in Beadle County, South Dakota, United States. The population was 459 at the 2020 census.

History
The first settlement at Wolsey was made in 1882. A post office has been in operation in Wolsey since 1883, the same year the town was platted. The township was organized the following year, in 1884.  The town of Wolsey was named for Thomas Wolsey, an English cardinal.

Geography

Wolsey is located at  (44.408775, -98.474139).

Wolsey has been assigned the ZIP code 57384 and the FIPS place code 72540.

Demographics

2010 census
As of the census of 2010, there were 376 people, 165 households, and 106 families residing in the town. The racial makeup of the town was 99.2% White, 0.3% Asian, and 0.5% from other races. Hispanic or Latino of any race were 0.8% of the population.

There were 165 households, of which 28.5% had children under the age of 18 living with them, 52.1% were married couples living together, 9.7% had a female householder with no husband present, 2.4% had a male householder with no wife present, and 35.8% were non-families. 32.1% of all households were made up of individuals, and 15.7% had someone living alone who was 65 years of age or older. The average household size was 2.28 and the average family size was 2.88.

The median age in the town was 43 years. 24.5% of residents were under the age of 18; 5.6% were between the ages of 18 and 24; 22.4% were from 25 to 44; 30.6% were from 45 to 64; and 17% were 65 years of age or older. The gender makeup of the town was 50.3% male and 49.7% female.

2000 census
As of the census of 2000, there were 418 people, 174 households, and 121 families residing in the town. The population density was 183.3 people per square mile (70.8/km2). There were 185 housing units at an average density of 81.1 per square mile (31.3/km2). The racial makeup of the town was 99.52% White, 0.24% Native American, and 0.24% from two or more races. Hispanic or Latino of any race were 0.48% of the population.

There were 174 households, out of which 28.7% had children under the age of 18 living with them, 60.3% were married couples living together, 5.7% had a female householder with no husband present, and 29.9% were non-families. 27.6% of all households were made up of individuals, and 19.0% had someone living alone who was 65 years of age or older. The average household size was 2.40 and the average family size was 2.92.

In the town, the population was spread out, with 24.4% under the age of 18, 5.7% from 18 to 24, 25.8% from 25 to 44, 23.4% from 45 to 64, and 20.6% who were 65 years of age or older. The median age was 43 years. For every 100 females, there were 100.0 males. For every 100 females age 18 and over, there were 95.1 males.

As of 2000 the median income for a household in the town was $35,313, and the median income for a family was $42,679. Males had a median income of $27,500 versus $20,288 for females. The per capita income for the town was $14,319. About 8.0% of families and 9.2% of the population were below the poverty line, including 9.2% of those under age 18 and 18.8% of those age 65 or over.

Notable people and events
Richard Warren Sears, founder of Sears, Roebuck, and Co, began his retail sales career by selling unclaimed watches while serving as a station agent for the railroad in Wolsey in the early 1880s.
Wolsey, SD, was featured on the Television series, Forensic Files, when the show highlighted a case in which a pastor of a local church was accused of murdering his wife of 30 years in 1999.
Wolsey, SD. once held annual Goat Races, a summer weekend event which would bring hundreds of people to the small town from miles around.
Greg Boe, a member of the Minnesota House of Representatives, was born and raised in Wolsey.

References

Towns in Beadle County, South Dakota
Towns in South Dakota